Patrick Hager (born 8 September 1988) is a German professional ice hockey player who currently plays for EHC München of the Deutsche Eishockey Liga (DEL).

Playing career
He previously played with the Krefeld Pinguine and ERC Ingolstadt. He joined Kölner Haie as a free agent, signing a two-year contract on 5 November 2014.

At the conclusion of his contract with Kölner Haie, Hager left to sign as a free agent with his fourth DEL club, EHC München, on a one-year deal on 31 May 2017.

International play
He participated at the 2010 IIHF World Championship as a member of the German National men's ice hockey team. He also represented Germany at the 2018 IIHF World Championship and the 2018 Winter Olympics.

Career statistics

Regular season and playoffs

International

References

External links
 

1988 births
ERC Ingolstadt players
German ice hockey left wingers
Kölner Haie players
Krefeld Pinguine players
Living people
EHC München players
Sportspeople from Stuttgart
Ice hockey players at the 2018 Winter Olympics
Medalists at the 2018 Winter Olympics
Olympic ice hockey players of Germany
Olympic medalists in ice hockey
Olympic silver medalists for Germany
Ice hockey players at the 2022 Winter Olympics